Mankaw may refer to several places in Burma:

 Mankaw, Shwegu
Mankaw, Kalewa